was a Japanese decathlete and educator. He competed at the 1920 Summer Olympics and finished in 12th place. He later was a professor of physical education at such universities as the Tokyo University of Education (now Tsukuba University) and Saitama University, contributing to the development of school athletics in Japan.

References

1888 births
1967 deaths
Japanese educators
Japanese decathletes
Japanese male pole vaulters
Olympic decathletes
Olympic athletes of Japan
Athletes (track and field) at the 1920 Summer Olympics
Japan Championships in Athletics winners
19th-century Japanese people
20th-century Japanese people